A tunneling nanotube (TNT) or membrane nanotube is a term that has been applied to protrusions that extend from the plasma membrane which enable different animal cells to touch over long distances, sometimes over 100 μm between T cells. Two types of structures have been called nanotubes. The first type are less than 0.7 micrometers in diameter, contain actin and carry portions of plasma membrane between cells in both directions. The second type are larger (>0.7 μm), contain both actin and microtubules, and can carry components of the cytoplasm such as vesicles and organelles between cells, including whole mitochondria. The diameter of TNTs ranges from 50 to 200 nm and they can reach lengths of several cell diameters. These structures may be involved in cell-to-cell communication, transfer of nucleic acids such as mRNA and miRNA between cells in culture or in a tissue, and the spread of pathogens or toxins such as HIV and prions. TNTs have observed lifetimes ranging from a few minutes up to several hours, and several proteins have been implicated in their formation or inhibition.

History 
Membrane nanotubes were first described in a 1999 Cell article examining the development of Drosophila melanogaster wing imaginal discs. More recently, a Science article published in 2004 described structures that connected various types of immune cells together, as well as connections between cells in tissue culture. Since these publications, more TNT-like structures have been recorded, containing varying levels of F-actin, microtubules and other components, but remaining relatively homogenous in terms of composition.

Formation 
Several mechanisms may be involved in nanotube formation. These include molecular controls as well as cell-to-cell interactions.

Two primary mechanisms for TNT formation have been proposed. The first involves cytoplasmic protrusions extending from one cell to another, where they fuse with the membrane of the target cell. The other is that, as two previously connected cells move away from one another, TNTs remain as bridges between the two cells.

Induction 
Some dendritic cells and THP-1 monocytes have been shown to connect via tunneling nanotubes and display evidence of calcium flux when exposed to bacterial or mechanical stimuli. TNT-mediated signaling has shown to produce spreading in target cells, similar to the lamellipodia produced when dendritic cells are exposed to bacterial products. The TNTs demonstrated in this study propagated at initial speed of 35 micrometers/second and have shown to connect THP-1 monocytes with nanotubes up to 100 micrometers long.

The formation of cytonemes towards a BnL-FGF gradient has been observed, suggesting that chemotactic controls may induce the formation of TNT-like structures. A supporting finding is that phosphatidylserine exposure guided TNT formation from mesenchymal stem cells (MSCs) to a population of injured cells. The protein S100A4 and its receptor have been shown to guide the direction of TNT growth, as p53 activates caspase 3 to cleave S100A4 in the initiating cell, thereby generating a gradient in which the target cell has higher amounts of the protein.

One study found that cell-to-cell contact was necessary for the formation of nanotube bridges between T cells. p53 activation has also been implicated as a necessary mechanism for the development of TNTs, as the downstream genes up-regulated by p53 (namely EGFR, Akt, PI3K, and mTOR) were found to be involved in nanotube formation following hydrogen peroxide treatment and serum starvation.  Connexin-43 has shown to promote connection between bone marrow stromal cells (BMSCs) and alveolar epithelial cells, leading to the formation of nanotubes.

Cellular stress by rotenone or TNF-α was also shown to induce TNT formation between epithelial cells. Inflammation by lipopolysaccharides or interferon-γ has shown to increase the expression of proteins related to TNT formation.

Inhibition 
TNT-like structures called streamers did not form when cultured with cytochalasin D, an F-actin depolymerizing compound, and a separate study using cytochalasin B found impacted TNT formation without the destruction of existing TNTs. Latrunculin-B, another F-actin depolymerizing compound, was found to completely block TNT formation. Blocking CD38, which had been implicated in the release of mitochondria by astrocytes, also significantly decreased TNT formation.

TNFAIP2, also called M-Sec, is known to mediate TNT formation, and knockdown of this protein by shRNA reduced TNT development in epithelial cells by about two-thirds.

Role in mitochondrial transfer 
Tunneling nanotubes have been implicated as one mechanism by which whole mitochondria can be transferred from cell to cell. Interestingly, a recent study in Nature Nanotechnology has reported that cancer cells can hijack the mitochondria from immune cells via physical tunneling nanotubes. Mitochondrial DNA damage appears to be the main trigger for the formation of TNTs in order to traffic entire mitochondria, though the exact threshold of damage necessary to induce TNT formation is yet unknown. The maximum speed of mitochondria traveling over TNTs was found to be about 80 nm/s, lower than the measured speed of 100-1400 nm/s of axonal transport of mitochondria; this could be due to the smaller diameter of TNTs inhibiting mitochondrial migration.

In one study, Ahmad et al. used four lines of mesenchymal stem cells, each expressing either a differing phenotype of the Rho-GTPase Miro1; a higher level of Miro1 was associated with more efficient mitochondrial transfer via TNTs. Several studies have shown, through the selective blockage of TNT formation, that TNTs are a primary mechanism for the trafficking of whole mitochondria between heterogeneous cells.

Role in infectious diseases 
Over two dozen types of viruses were found to transfer through and/or modulate TNT. A 2022 study suggests that SARS-CoV-2 builds tunneling nanotubes from nose cells to gain access to the brain.

Similar structures 
A structure called a cytoneme enables exchanges between signaling centers. Cytonemes, however, do not always connect two cells and can act solely as environmental sensors.

Plasmodesmata have been identified as functional channels interconnecting plant cells, and stromules interconnect plastids.

Myopodia are actin-rich cytoplasmic extensions which have been observed in embryonic Drosophila. Similar structures have been observed in Xenopus and mouse models. Actin-containing cellular protrusions dubbed "streamers" have been observed in cultured B cells.

Vesicular transport in membrane nanotubes has been modeled utilizing a continuum approach. A variety of synthetic nanotubes, based on stacking of cyclic peptides and other cyclic molecules, have been investigated.

See also 

 Actin
 Microtubule
 Cytoneme
 Plasmodesmata
 Stromules
 Lamellipodium
 Horizontal transfer of mitochondria

References

Further reading

External links 
Hans-Hermann Gerdes Research Group - The laboratory that first observed membrane nanotubes

Cell anatomy
Membrane biology